Vladimir Pavlovich Biryukov (10 O.S./22 July 1888–18 June 1971) was a Soviet ethnographer, lexicographer, museum worker, archaeologist, historian, folklorist, and the author of over 30 books. He specifically studied the folklore of the Ural region of Siberia.

Career 
Vladimir Biryukov was born in the Pershinskoye village, Perm Governorate (now Dalmatovsky District, Kurgan Oblast) in the family of the secretary-accountant. He studied at the Perm Theological Seminary, but eventually decided against becoming a priest. He graduated from the Kazan Veterinary Institute in 1912 and then from the Moscow Archaeological Institute in 1915. He became an archaeologist. For two years he studied at the Russian State Agricultural University, attended classes at the Tomsk State University since the end of 1919.

In 1910 Vladimir Biryukov organized a museum in Pershinskoye, the first village museum in the area. The museum was transferred to Shadrinsk and now called the Shadrinsk Local History Museum named after V. P. Biryukov. Since 1920 he headed the Museum of Antiquities under the Perm State University. Since 1923 he was an active member of the Academy of Sciences of the USSR, participating in conferences and plenary meetings. From the 1920s to 1933 he edited the Academy of Sciences's Russian Language Dictionary. When in the mid-1930s Sverdlovsk Publishing House decided to publish the collection Prerevolutionary Folklore of the Urals, he was offered to make such a collection.

From 1930 to 1938 he worked in Sverdlovsk, in the regional bureau that studied local culture, then lived in Shadrinsk and then in Sverdlovsk again. He became the member of the Union of Soviet Writers in 1955. He died and was buried in Sverdlovsk.

Selected publications 
 Cemetery as a subject for studies and a place for excursions, 1922
 Sketches of local history, 1923
 Nature and population of the Shadrinsk okrug, Ural region, 1926
 Questionnaire on local history, 1929
 Historical information on the studying of local culture. The collection of articles on local history, 1930
 From the history of porcelain and faience in Priisetye. The collection of articles on local history, 1930
 Why, where and how to look for minerals (short manual), 1932
 Search for the new oil and gas fields at the Urals, 1933
 The Iset River, 1936
 Prerevolutionary Folklore of the Urals, 1936
 Poets in the second half of the 19th century. Selected works, 1937
 Skazy, songs, chastushkas, 1937
 Ural fairy tales, 1940
 Ural folklore. Historical skazy and songs, 1949
 Soviet Ural. Folk stories and oral poetry, 1958
 The first steps of the social democratic movement in Shadrinsk, 1960

References 

1888 births
1971 deaths
Soviet archaeologists
Soviet historians
Local historians